Guanghe County is a county in the Linxia Hui Autonomous Prefecture, located in the province of Gansu of the People's Republic of China. It contains an ethnic minority of the Dongxiang.

Administrative divisions
Guanghe County is divided to 6 towns 2 townships and 1 ethnic township.
Towns

Townships
 Shuiquan Township()
 Guanfang Township()

1 Ethnic township
 Alimatu Dongxiang Township()

Climate

Sources 

County-level divisions of Gansu
Linxia Hui Autonomous Prefecture